This article presents a timeline of events in British history before 1000.

Timeline of Prehistoric Britain
Timeline of British history (1000-1499)

To 999

AD
43   Roman invasion of Britain, ordered by Claudius, who dispatches Aulus Plautius and an army of some 40,000 men
60   Revolt against the Roman occupation, led by Boudica of the Iceni, begins
c. 84 Romans defeat Caledonians at the battle of Mons Graupius
122  Construction of Hadrian's Wall begins
142  Construction of Antonine Wall in Scotland begins
c. 383 Beginning of Roman withdrawal from Britain
410 Last Roman leaves Britain and tells the natives to defend themselves from other invaders overseas, as Rome is under attack from the Goths
449  Hengest, Saxon leader, arrives in England
c. 466 Battle of Wippedesfleot
597  Arrival of St. Augustine
793  Vikings raid Lindisfarne
802  Vikings ransack monastery on Iona
843  Birth of Kingdom of Scotland with union of the Picts and the Scots
878  Battle of Ethandun, defeat of Viking forces, results in Treaty of Wedmore and establishment of the Danelaw
895  Danish fleet captured by Alfred the Great

See also 
 British Iron Age
 Early Middle Ages
 Timeline of British history
 History of the British Isles
 History of England
 History of Ireland
 History of Northern Ireland
 History of Scotland
 History of Wales
 History of the United Kingdom
 Prehistory

References

British history timelines